Sarchinu Bala (also Romanized as Sarchīnū Bālā; also known as Sarchīnū-ye ‘Olyā) is a village in Madvarat Rural District, in the Central District of Shahr-e Babak County, Kerman Province, Iran. At the 2006 census, its population was 45, in 13 families.

References 

Populated places in Shahr-e Babak County